Pierre Nguyễn Huy Mai (July 3, 1913 − August 4, 1990) was a Vietnamese Roman Catholic bishop.

Ordained to the priesthood in 1941, Nguyễn Huy Mai was named bishop of the Roman Catholic Diocese of Ban Mê Thuột, Vietnam and ordained to the episcopate on August 15, 1967. He died in 1990 while still in office.

References

1913 births
1990 deaths
People from Hanoi